Reef Peretz (born February 25, 1991) is an Israeli footballer who plays as a center back for Israeli football club Shimshon Tel Aviv. His brother is Dor Peretz, who is also a footballer.

Early life
Peretz was born in Hod HaSharon, Israel, to a Jewish family. Peretz attended Hadarim High School in Hod HaSharon.

Club career
Reef Peretz first joined the senior team in the 2009/10 season and made his debut on August 15, 2009 and, after two appearances in the Toto Cup games, he opened the first League round against Sachnin and played for 45 minutes. That season, Peretz was still part of the Maccabi Tel Aviv junior squad, and he again played in a Toto Cup game. In the final League round of that season, Peretz played in the game that ended in a victory over F.C. Ashdod. In the 2010/11 season, Peretz played on the senior team in eight League games and won a double title with the Club's junior team. Unfortunately, a knee injury forced the young defender to watch the 2011/12 season, which could have been his breakthrough season, from the sidelines.

Honours
Maccabi Tel Aviv
Israeli Noar Premier League (2): 2011–12
Israeli Noar Premier League Cup (1): 2010–11
Israeli Premier League (1): 2012–13

References

External links
 Reef profile on Maccabi Tel Aviv official website.
 
 

1991 births
Living people
Israeli Jews
Israeli footballers
Maccabi Tel Aviv F.C. players
Hapoel Nir Ramat HaSharon F.C. players
Hapoel Petah Tikva F.C. players
Hapoel Ramat Gan F.C. players
Hapoel Hod HaSharon F.C. players
Shimshon Tel Aviv F.C. players
Israeli Premier League players
Liga Leumit players
Footballers from Hod HaSharon
Israeli people of Moroccan-Jewish descent
Association football defenders